Cosmos parviflorus  is a North American species of plants in the family Asteraceae. Common names include southwestern cosmos in the US and juve or aceitilla blanca in Mexico. In many places it is a common weed in agricultural fields, although it also grows in grassy meadows in forested areas. The species appears to be native in Texas, New Mexico, Colorado, Arizona, and Utah. Collections have also been made from  Massachusetts, Maine, Maryland, Missouri, Rhode Island, although it appears to be introduced to those regions. It is widespread in Mexico from Chihuahua to Oaxaca.

Description
Cosmos parviflorus attains a height of up to 100 cm (40 inches). Leaves are deeply divided into narrow linear segments. Ray florets red, pink or white, the colors sometimes mixed in the same population. Achenes are barbed, causing them to lodge in fur or clothing. They can thus be transported over long distances.

References

External links
Photo of herbarium specimen at University of Texas Herbarium in Austin, collected in Mexico State in central Mexico

parviflorus
Flora of North America
Plants described in 1798